Team Budget Forklifts was an Australian UCI Continental cycling team established in 2008. The team disbanded in 2015.

For the 2015 season the team was able to sign World Hour record holder Jack Bobridge

Major wins

2009
Stage 8 Tour of Wellington, Jack Anderson
Oceania Time Trial Championships, Jack Anderson
Stage 1 Tour de Singkarak, Malcolm Rudolph
2013
 National Time Trial Championships, Michael Vink
Memorial Van Coningsloo, Michael Vink
Stage 2 Tour de Singkarak, Jacob Kauffman
Stage 6 Tour of Taihu Lake, Jesse Kerrison
2014
Overall New Zealand Cycle Classic, Michael Vink
Prologue, Michael Vink
Overall Tour de Hokkaido, Joshua Prete
Overall Tour of Taihu Lake, Sam Witmitz
Stage 1, Jesse Kerrison
Stages 3, 6 & 7, Sam Witmitz
Tour of Yancheng Coastal Wetlands, Jesse Kerrison
2015
Stage 4 New Zealand Cycle Classic, Joshua Prete
Stage 3a (ITT) Tour de Beauce, Brendan Canty

National and continental champions
2009
 Oceania Time Trial Championships, Jack Anderson
2013
 New Zealand National Time Trial Championships, Michael Vink

2014 roster
As at 31 December 2014

References

UCI Continental Teams (Oceania)
Cycling teams established in 2008
Cycling teams disestablished in 2015
Cycling teams based in Australia